Đông Hà station is one of the main railway stations on the North–South railway (Reunification Express) in Vietnam. It serves the city of Đông Hà.

References

Dong Ha
Railway stations in Vietnam
Buildings and structures in Quảng Trị province